Wadsworth A. Parker (b. 1864 – d. 1938, Petersburg, Virginia) was an American printer and typeface designer.  He was a director of the American Type Founders Company, designed many faces for them, and served as head of their specimen department.  His faces are typically highly decorative and often capture the Art Deco style of the time.

Typefaces designed Wadsworth A. Parker
All faces cut by American Type Founders.
 Goudy Handtooled + italic (1922), alternately credited to either Charles H. Becker  or Morris Fuller Benton.
 Lexington (1926), with Clarence P. Hornung.
 Gallia (1927)
 Modernistic (1928)
 Graybar (1930)
 Additions to M.F. Bentons's Stymie series:
 Stymie Compressed (1932)
 Stymie Inline Title (1932)
 Swash letters for Bookman (1936?)

References
 MacGrew, Mac, American Metal Typefaces of the Twentieth Century, Oak Knoll Books, New Castle Delaware, 1993, .
 Rollins, Carl Purlington American Type Designers and Their Work. in Print, V. 4, #1, p. 13.

American typographers and type designers
1864 births
1938 deaths
American printers